The 1948–49 FA Cup was the 68th staging of the world's oldest football cup competition, the Football Association Challenge Cup, commonly known as the FA Cup. Wolverhampton Wanderers won the competition for the third time, beating Leicester City 3–1 in the final at Wembley.

Matches were scheduled to be played at the stadium of the team named first on the date specified for each round, which was always a Saturday. Some matches, however, might be rescheduled for other days if there were clashes with games for other competitions or the weather was inclement. If scores were level after 90 minutes had been played, a replay would take place at the stadium of the second-named team later the same week. If the replayed match was drawn further replays would be held until a winner was determined. If scores were level after 90 minutes had been played in a replay, a 30-minute period of extra time would be played.

Calendar

First round proper

At this stage 43 clubs from the Football League Third Division North and South joined the 25 non-league clubs having come through the qualifying rounds. Rotherham United, Bournemouth & Boscombe Athletic, as the strongest non-promoted Third Division finishers in the previous season, were given a bye to the third round, along with Swindon Town, who managed to reach the fifth round of the previous season's competition. To make the number of matches up, non-league Leytonstone and Colchester United were given byes to this round. 34 matches were scheduled to be played on Saturday, 27 November 1948, with eight of these postponed until the following Saturday. Two were drawn and went to replays.

Second round proper
The matches were played on Saturday, 11 December 1948. Four matches were drawn, with replays taking place the following Saturday.

Third round proper
The 44 First and Second Division clubs entered the competition at this stage, along with Rotherham United, Swindon Town and Bournemouth & Boscombe Athletic. The matches were scheduled for Saturday, 8 January 1949. Four matches were drawn and went to replays on the following Saturday, with two of these going to a second replay.

Fourth round proper
The matches were scheduled for Saturday, 29 January 1949. Three games were drawn and went to replays, which were all played on the following Saturday. Manchester United and Bradford Park Avenue went to a second replay on the following Monday, with Manchester United easily winning the tie to go through.

Fifth round proper
The matches were scheduled for Saturday, 12 February 1949. There was one replay, taking place the following Saturday.

Sixth round proper
The draw for the sixth round was made on Monday, 14 February 1949. All matches were played on Saturday, 26 February 1949.

Semifinals
The draw for the semi finals was made on Monday, 28 February 1949. Both original matches were played on Saturday, 26 March 1949.

Replay

Final

See also
FA Cup final results 1872-

References
General
Official site; fixtures and results service at TheFA.com
1948-49 FA Cup at rssf.com
1948-49 FA Cup at soccerbase.com

Specific

 
FA Cup seasons